Bopasenatla Secondary School is a government secondary school in Diepkloof, Soweto. It was previously known as Junior Secondary School.

History
The school was started in 1972 when it was called Junior Secondary School. Bopasenatla is a Sotho word that means to build a strong human. It teaches years 8 to 12 in Diepkloof, Soweto.

In 2000 Lucas Radebe who had become the captain of the Leeds United football club returned to make a gift of computers. Radabe had left the school from year eight to go to a quieter neighbourhood.

Today it has under 600 pupils who are taught by approximately twenty educators. The school has a technology lab and a computer lab. The school also claims a library, but reports of a fire of books in 2012 said there was no library.

Alumni
Notable alumni include:
Sello "Chicco" Twala - musician 
Lucas Radebe - Leeds United footballer

References

1972 establishments in South Africa
Buildings and structures in Soweto
Educational institutions established in 1972
High schools in South Africa
Schools in Gauteng